Nikki Todd, (born July 7, 1990) is a Canadian professional squash player who represents Canada. She reached a career-high world ranking of World No. 49 in April 2018.

In January 2018, Todd was named to Canada's 2018 Commonwealth Games team.

References

External links 

1990 births
Living people
Canadian female squash players
Commonwealth Games competitors for Canada
Pan American Games medalists in squash
Pan American Games silver medalists for Canada
Sportspeople from Regina, Saskatchewan
Sportspeople from Toronto
Squash players at the 2015 Pan American Games
Squash players at the 2018 Commonwealth Games
Medalists at the 2015 Pan American Games
21st-century Canadian women
Competitors at the 2022 World Games